Bonifazio Caetani (1567–1617) was a Roman Catholic cardinal.

Episcopal succession
While bishop, he was the principal consecrator of:

References

1566 births
1617 deaths
17th-century Italian cardinals
17th-century Italian Roman Catholic archbishops
Clergy from Rome